Antennarius is a genus of 11 species of fish in the family Antennariidae. These fish spend most of their lives on the bottom in relatively shallow water between 20 and 100 m. They can be found worldwide in tropical and subtropical waters. They are well-camouflaged ambush predators that wait for prey fish to pass by. They have "lures" which they move to attract the prey. They have little economic value other than a minor role in the aquarium trade. Commerson's frogfish was the first species in this genus to be described, in 1798.

Species

References

Antennariidae
Marine fish genera
Taxa named by François Marie Daudin